John Kling is the protagonist of a German TV series featuring a secret agent who tackles international missions all over the world. He works as detective for an American secret service, usually teaming up with his colleague and friend Jones Burthe (Uwe Friedrichsen).

Background 
John Kling was in the beginning a pulp fiction hero who was very successful as such from 1924 till 1939 and from 1949 till 1954. Based on those novels he eventually entered the TV screen where his 26 new adventures where broadcast in the late sixties.

While in pulp fiction he was a successor of Percy Stuart (whose first tale had already been released ten years before John Kling appeared), on TV he was his predecessor. Hans-Georg Thiemt directed this series before he directed Percy Stuart.

Season 1 (1965-1966)

Season 2 (1969-1970)

External links 
 
 TV Nostalgy: John Kling's Adventures

Espionage television series
Kling, John
Television shows based on German novels
1965 German television series debuts
1970 German television series endings
German action television series
German-language television shows
ZDF original programming